Leopold IV Frederick, Duke of Anhalt (1 October 1794 – 22 May 1871) was a German prince of the House of Ascania.

From 1817 until 1853 he was ruler of the duchy of Anhalt-Dessau and from 1847 until 1853 also ruler of the duchy of Anhalt-Köthen. From 1853 until 1863 he was the ruler of the joined duchy of Anhalt-Dessau-Köthen and from 1863 the first ruler of the united duchy of Anhalt.

Early life
Leopold was born in Dessau on 1 October 1794 as the eldest son of Frederick, Hereditary Prince of Anhalt-Dessau, by his wife Landgravine Amalie of Hesse-Homburg, daughter of Frederick V, Landgrave of Hesse-Homburg.

Following the premature death of his father in 1814, he became heir to the duchy of Anhalt-Dessau.

Reign
Following the death of his grandfather Leopold III he succeeded as duke on 9 August 1817.

During the Revolutions of 1848 he was forced to grant a constitution to Dessau on 29 October 1848.  It was revoked, however, on 4 November 1849, then replaced with a new version in October 1859. Leopold maintained a friendship with his administrative officer Wilhelm Christian Raster, though Raster's politically active son, Hermann participated in the revolutions. The younger Raster was given the unusual choice to either stay in Anhalt-Dessau and face criminal prosecution for his role in the Revolution or to emigrate from the country freely like other Forty-Eighters. Raster made the second choice and eventually became a powerful Republican Party political boss in the United States.

On 27 November 1847 he inherited the Duchy of Anhalt-Köthen from his distant cousin Duke Henry. As a result of a treaty concluded with Anhalt-Bernburg in May 1853 his duchies were joined together and named Anhalt-Dessau-Köthen, because the eventual inheritance of Leopold over all the Anhalt duchies seemed inevitable. The death of another distant cousin, Duke Alexander Karl, on 19 August 1863 resulted in the ruling line of the duchy of Anhalt-Bernburg becoming extinct, thus Leopold inherited that duchy as well. On 30 August he assumed the title "duke of Anhalt."

Leopold died in Dessau on 22 May 1871. He was succeeded by his son Frederick.

Marriage and issue
In Berlin on 18 April 1818 Leopold married Princess Frederica of Prussia (b. Berlin, 30 September 1796 - d. Dessau, 1 January 1850), daughter of Prince Frederick Louis Charles of Prussia (brother of King Frederick William III of Prussia) by his wife Frederica of Mecklenburg-Strelitz; through her mother's last marriage, she was a half-sister of King George V of Hanover. They had been engaged since 17 May 1816, as the connection had already been arranged by the Prussian court. This dynastic connection was an expression of Leopold's pro-Prussian policies.
They had six children:

Honours
He received the following orders and decorations:

Ancestry

References

1794 births
1871 deaths
People from Dessau-Roßlau
House of Ascania
Dukes of Anhalt
Dukes of Anhalt-Köthen
Grand Crosses of the Order of Saint Stephen of Hungary
Recipients of the Order of St. Anna, 1st class
Royal reburials